Brandt Iden (born July 5, 1983) is an American politician who has served in the Michigan House of Representatives from the 61st district since 2015.

A Kalamazoo College graduate, Iden is in the commercial real estate business.  He was on the Kalamazoo County Board of Commissioners for two terms before being elected to the Michigan House of Representatives in 2014. He won a close race for re-election in 2016. He won re-election in 2018, again by a narrow margin. He could not run for reelection in 2020 due to term limits. His final term ended on December 31, 2020.

References

1983 births
Living people
Republican Party members of the Michigan House of Representatives
21st-century American politicians
People from Battle Creek, Michigan